Natasha Howard (born September 2, 1991) is an American professional basketball player for the Dallas Wings of the Women's National Basketball Association (WNBA) and Dynamo Kursk of the Russian Premier League. Howard was the 2019 WNBA Defensive Player of the Year. She was drafted in 2014 by the Indiana Fever. Born in Toledo, Ohio, she played college basketball for Florida State University, where she finished sixth in the NCAA for field goal percentage.

Florida  State statistics

Source

WNBA career

Howard was selected 5th overall by the Indiana Fever in the 2014 WNBA Draft. Howard started off the 2014 season hot scoring 16 points and 21 points in her first two games as a professional. The 21 point performance was a career high in points. After her rookie season in Indiana, Howard averaged 7.0 points and 3.1 rebounds.

During her second season with Indiana, Howard regressed in both points and rebounding, averaging 4.2 points and 2.6 rebounds. The only times that Howard scored in double figures were an August 4 loss to the Chicago Sky, when she scored 13 points, and on a September 1 win against the Connecticut Sun, when she scored 10 points. During her second season, the Fever reached the WNBA Finals, where they faced off against the Minnesota Lynx. The Fever ultimately lost the series 3–2, but Howard didn't miss a single shot throughout the entire Finals, going 8 for 8 from the floor in five games.

On February 2, 2016, the Fever traded Howard to the Minnesota Lynx in a sign-and-trade deal to acquire Devereaux Peters.

During her first season with the Lynx, Howard was part of the post rotation that included Sylvia Fowles, Rebekkah Brunson, and Janel McCarville. She became a key contributor off the bench for the Lynx the entire season. In her first game against Indiana since the trade, Howard scored 11 points, on 5–5 shooting, and grabbed 3 rebounds. She matched her career high of 21 points in a July 2 win against the San Antonio Stars. Howard, once again, reached the WNBA Finals for the 2nd consecutive season, although she fell short once again falling to the Los Angeles Sparks 3–2.

In her second season with the Lynx, Howard continued with her bench role, contributing with her scoring and rebounding, helping the Lynx back to championship contention. The Lynx made it back to the Finals, making it Howard's third appearance in the finals. This time in a finals rematch against the Sparks, the Lynx won in five games, earning Howard her first championship.

On February 7, 2018, Howard was traded to the Seattle Storm in exchange for a second round pick in the 2018 WNBA Draft. In the 2018 season, Howard would be the starting power forward for the Storm. She would have the best season of her career in Seattle as she averaged career-highs in scoring, blocks, rebounds, assists and steals. Howard would also be named to the WNBA All-Defensive First Team and was second in the league in blocks. The Storm finished with a league-best 26–8 record. They would receive a double-bye to the semi-finals. In the semi-finals series, the Storm would defeat the Phoenix Mercury in five games advancing to the Finals, making this Howard's fourth consecutive finals appearance. In the Finals, the Storm would defeat the Washington Mystics in a three-game sweep. In Game 3, Howard scored a new career-high 29 points along with 14 rebounds.

In 2019, Howard would have a breakout season. She would be voted into the 2019 WNBA All-Star Game, making it her first all-star appearance. On July 17, 2019, Howard scored a new career-high 33 points in a 90–79 victory over the Minnesota Lynx. Howard would finish the season average a new career-high in scoring, rebounds, assists and steals. She was made a WNBA All-Star and named to the WNBA All-Defensive First Team for the second time while also winning the WNBA Defensive Player of the Year Award. The Storm finished as the number 6 seed with an 18–16 record. The Storm however were unable to defend their title in the playoffs as they were eliminated in the second round elimination game by the Los Angeles Sparks.

In 2020, the season was delayed and shortened to 22 games in a bubble at IMG Academy due to the COVID-19 pandemic. Howard played all 22 games, the Storm had a fully active roster with everyone healthy and available as they finished the season 18–4 with the number 2 seed, receiving a double-bye to the semi-finals. In the semi-finals they would defeat the Minnesota Lynx in a three-game sweep, going back to the Finals for the second time in three years. In the Finals, the Storm would sweep the Las Vegas Aces to win the series, earning Howard her third WNBA championship.

In 2021, Howard was acquired by the New York Liberty in a three-team trade deal.

In January 2023, Howard was traded to the Dallas Wings in a three-team deal.

WNBA career statistics

Regular season

|-
| align="left" | 2014
| align="left" | Indiana
| 34 || 15 || 17.0 || .443 || .000 || .594 || 3.1 || 0.6 || 0.8 || 0.6 || 1.5 || 7.0
|-
| align="left" | 2015
| align="left" | Indiana
| 30 || 2 || 11.4 || .379 || .000 || .721 || 2.6 || 0.4 || 0.4 || 0.4 || 0.9 || 4.2
|-
| align="left" | 2016
| align="left" | Minnesota
| 34 || 1 || 14.6 || .574 || .200 || .677 || 3.6 || 0.8 || 0.7 || 0.7 || 1.1 || 6.7
|-
|style="text-align:left;background:#afe6ba;"|  2017†
| align="left" | Minnesota
| 34 || 0 || 11.7 || .484 || .214 || .733 || 2.4 || 0.7 || 0.5 || 0.6 ||0.7 || 4.3
|-
|style="text-align:left;background:#afe6ba;"|  2018†
| align="left" | Seattle
| 34 || 33 || 25.6 || .547 || .327 || .798 || 6.4 || 1.0 || 1.2 || 1.9 || 1.8 || 13.2
|-
| align="left" | 2019
| align="left" | Seattle
| 34 || 34 || 31.3 || .439 || .308 || .810 || 8.2 || 2.1 || 2.2 || 1.7 || 2.9 || 18.1
|-
|style="text-align:left;background:#afe6ba;"| 2020†
| align="left" | Seattle
| 22 || 22 || 21.0 || .530 || .350 || .778 || 7.1 || 1.0 || 1.7 || 0.6 || 2.1 || 9.5
|-
| align="left" | 2021
| align="left" | New York
| 13 || 13 || 27.5 || .494 || .333 || .774 || 7.2 || 1.7 || 1.3 || 0.5 || 3.8 || 16.2
|-
| align="left" | 2022
| align="left" | New York
| 35 || 35 || 29.9 || .482 || .326 || .715 || 7.3 || 2.3 || 1.3 || 1.0 || 3.2 || 15.1
|-
| align="left" | Career
| align="left" | 9 years, 4 teams
| 270 || 155 || 20.8 || .483 || .313 || .742 || 5.1 || 1.2 || 1.1 || 1.0 || 1.9 || 10.2

Playoffs

|-
| align="left" | 2014
| align="left" | Indiana
| 4 || 0 || 3.7 || .167 || .000 || 1.000 || 1.0 || 0.0 || 0.0 || 0.0 || 0.5 || 1.0
|-
| align="left" | 2015
| align="left" | Indiana
| 9 || 0 || 7.1 || .917 || .000 || 1.000 || 0.6 || 0.3 || 0.3 || 0.1 || 0.5 || 2.8
|-
| align="left" | 2016
| align="left" | Minnesota
| 8  || 0  || 13.0 || .700 || .000 || .429 || 2.6 || 0.6 || 0.8 || 0.1 || 0.7 || 5.6
|-
|style="text-align:left;background:#afe6ba;"|  2017†
| align="left" | Minnesota
| 7  || 0  || 5.6|| .200 || .000 || .800 || 0.9 || 0.0 || 0.2 || 0.0 || 0.5 || 1.1
|-
|style="text-align:left;background:#afe6ba;"|  2018†
| align="left" | Seattle
| 8 || 8 || 31.5 || .573 || .500 || .850 || 8.3 || 1.5 || 1.0 || 1.3 || 2.2 || 15.8
|-
| align="left" | 2019
| align="left" | Seattle
| 2  || 2  || 28.8 || .400 || .429 || .750 || 9.0 || 4.0 || 2.0 || 1.5 || 2.0 || 11.0
|-
|style="text-align:left;background:#afe6ba;"| 2020†
| align="left" | Seattle
| 6  || 6 || 23.0 || .548 || .500 || .772 || 5.2 || 1.5 || 1.2 || 0.8 || 1.5 || 9.5
|-
| align="left" | 2021
| align="left" | New York
| 1  || 1  || 31.0 || .438 || .500 || .000 || 10.0 || 2.0 || 1.0 || 1.0 || 3.0 || 16.0
|-
| align="left" | 2022
| align="left" | New York
| 3 || 3 || 27.7 || .442 || .100 || 1.000 || 6.7 || 1.0 || 0.7 || 0.0 || 2.0 || 14.7
|-
| align="left" | Career
| align="left" | 9 years, 4 teams
| 48 || 20 || 16.3 || .534 || .381 || .789 || 3.8 || 0.9 || 0.7 || 0.5 || 1.2 || 7.2

References

External links

WNBA Rookie Profile
Florida State Seminoles bio

1991 births
Living people
American expatriate basketball people in China
American expatriate basketball people in Israel
American expatriate basketball people in Turkey
American women's basketball players
Basketball players from Ohio
Florida State Seminoles women's basketball players
Indiana Fever draft picks
Indiana Fever players
LGBT basketball players
LGBT people from Ohio
Lesbian sportswomen
McDonald's High School All-Americans
Minnesota Lynx players
New York Liberty players
Parade High School All-Americans (girls' basketball)
Power forwards (basketball)
Seattle Storm players
Sportspeople from Toledo, Ohio
Xinjiang Magic Deer players
Women's National Basketball Association All-Stars